Gilbert Dean (August 14, 1819 Pleasant Valley, Dutchess County, New York – October 12, 1870 Poughkeepsie, New York, Dutchess Co., NY) was an American lawyer and politician from New York, serving two terms in the U.S. House of Representatives from 1851 to 1854.

Life
He was educated at Amenia Seminary, and graduated from Yale College in 1841. Then he studied law, was admitted to the bar, and commenced practice in Poughkeepsie in 1844.

Dean was elected as a Democrat to the 32nd and 33rd United States Congresses, and served from March 4, 1851, to July 3, 1854, when he resigned.

He was appointed a justice of the New York Supreme Court (2nd District) on June 26, 1854, to fill the vacancy caused by the death of Seward Barculo, and remained on the bench until the end of 1855, being ex officio a judge of the New York Court of Appeals in 1855. Afterwards he removed to New York City, and resumed the practice of law.

He was a member of the New York State Assembly (New York Co., 15th D.) in 1863, and was the Democratic candidate for Speaker in the tied assembly. Dean and the Republican candidate Henry Sherwood retired after the 78th ballot, and Theophilus C. Callicot was elected Speaker on the 92nd ballot.

Death 
He died on October 12, 1870 and was buried at the Presbyterian Cemetery in Pleasant Valley. Later he was re-interred at the Portland Evergreen Cemetery in Brocton, New York.

References

The New York Civil List compiled by Franklin Benjamin Hough (pages 350; Weed, Parsons and Co., 1858)
 Court of Appeals judges

1819 births
1870 deaths
Yale College alumni
People from Pleasant Valley, New York
New York Supreme Court Justices
Judges of the New York Court of Appeals
Democratic Party members of the United States House of Representatives from New York (state)
19th-century American politicians
19th-century American judges